Casaloldo is a comune (municipality) in the Province of Mantua in the Italian region Lombardy, located about  east of Milan and about  northwest of Mantua.

Casaloldo borders the following municipalities: Asola, Castel Goffredo, Ceresara, Piubega.

Demographic evolution

References

External links
 www.comune.casaloldo.mn.it/

Cities and towns in Lombardy